The  17th Finswimming World Championships were held between 05–12 August 2013 in Kazan, Russia, at the Burevestnik swimming pool as part of the CMAS Games 2013.

Schedule

Medal table
 Host nation

Long distance events

Pool events
The pool part of the championships was held from 5 to 9 August 2013 at the Burevestnik swimming pool in Kazan, Russia.

Schedule

The finswimming competition featured races in a long course (50 m) pool in 30 events (15 for males, 15 for females; 13 individual events and 2 relays for each gender).

The evening session schedule for the 2013 Finswimming Championships:

Note: every distances have preliminary heats and finals, but only 800m immersion is on direct final on morning sessions.

Medal table

Men's events

Women's events

References

Finswimming World Championships
International sports competitions hosted by Russia
Finswimming World Championships
Sport in Kazan
21st century in Kazan
Finswimming World Championships
Finswimming World Championships